Loggans Moor is a nature reserve and Site of Special Scientific Interest, noted for its biological characteristics, in west Cornwall, England, UK. It is located 1 mile north-east of the town of Hayle, off the A30 road.

The  nature reserve is owned by Cornwall Wildlife Trust.

References

Nature reserves of the Cornwall Wildlife Trust
Sites of Special Scientific Interest in Cornwall
Sites of Special Scientific Interest notified in 1986